Mario Villamor Lopez (born June 4, 1955) is an associate justice of the Supreme Court of the Philippines.  He was appointed by President Rodrigo Duterte to replace Francis Jardeleza.

Education 

Lopez earned a law degree from San Beda College. He later earned a Master of Laws from the University of Santo Tomas.

Career 

He served as prosecutor of the Tanodbayan, now known as the office of the Ombudsman in 1985 and became executive judge of Batangas City in 1997 before his appointment to the Court of Appeals.

Supreme Court appointment 

Lopez had first interviewed for the seat vacated by Noel Tijam. Mariano del Castillo  which was later filled by Rodil Zalameda. On December 3, 2019, Lopez was appointed to the court to fill the seat vacated by Francis Jardeleza.

Personal 

Lopez is from La Union.

References 

1955 births
Living people
Associate Justices of the Supreme Court of the Philippines
20th-century Filipino judges
Justices of the Court of Appeals of the Philippines
People from La Union
San Beda University alumni
University of Santo Tomas alumni
21st-century Filipino judges